Harry Gilmore may refer to:
 Harry Gilmor, Confederate cavalry officer and the Baltimore City Police Commissioner
 Harry J. Gilmore, American diplomat